Thomas Phillips (1770–1845) was an English painter.

Thomas or Tom Phillips may also refer to:

Business
 Thomas L. Phillips Jr., businessman, co-founder of Spy magazine
 Tom Phillips, former chief executive officer of Mitsubishi Motors Australia
 Thomas L. Phillips, chairman and chief executive officer of Raytheon

Entertainment
 Thomas King Ekundayo Phillips (1884–1969), Nigerian organist, conductor, composer and teacher
 Thomas Hal Phillips (1922–2007), American actor and screenwriter
 Tom Phillips (artist) (1937–2022), English artist
 Tom Phillips (musician), American musician in the band While Heaven Wept
 Tom Phillips, author of 2018 non-fiction book Humans: A Brief History of How We F*cked It All Up

Law
 Thomas Hawthorne Phillips (1914–1975), Justice of the Supreme Court of Texas
 Thomas W. Phillips (judge) (born 1943), federal judge, District Court for the Eastern District of Tennessee
 Thomas R. Phillips (born 1949), Chief Justice of the Texas Supreme Court

Politics
 Thomas Phillips (Irish adventurer) (1560–1633), founder of Limavady, governor of the county of Coleraine, first license to distil whiskey
 Thomas Phillips (mayor) (1801–1867), Welsh lawyer, politician and businessman
 Thomas Wharton Phillips (1835–1912), Republican member of the U.S. House of Representatives from Pennsylvania
 Thomas Wharton Phillips Jr. (1874–1956), Republican member of the U.S. House of Representatives from Pennsylvania
 Thomas Williams Phillips (1883–1966), British civil servant
 Tom Phillips (diplomat) (born 1950), British diplomat
 Tom Phillips (Kansas politician), Republican member of the Kansas House of Representatives
 Thomas Phillips (MP for Hastings) (died 1626), MP for Hastings
 Sir Thomas Phelipps, 1st Baronet or Thomas Phillips, MP for Winchester
 Thomas Phelips or Phillips, MP for Poole and Wareham

Sports
 Tommy Phillips (1883–1923), Canadian ice hockey star and war hero
 Tom Phillips (baseball) (1889–1929), American baseball pitcher for the Baltimore Orioles and Cleveland Indians
 Tom Phillips (racing driver) (born 1962), American race car driver
 Tom Phillips (wrestling) (born 1989), American wrestling commentator
 Tom Phillips (Australian footballer) (born 1996), for the Hawthorn Football Club
 Tom Phillips (rugby union) (born 1996), Welsh rugby player
 Thomas Phillips (rower), American rower who won gold medal at the 1979 World Rowing Championships

Other
 Thomas G. Phillips (1937–2022), English physicist and astronomer
 Thomas Phelippes (1556–1625), English intelligence agent
 Thomas Phillips (engineer) (died 1693), English military engineer
 Thomas Phillips (priest) (1708–1774), English Jesuit biographer
 Thomas Phillips (educational benefactor) (1760–1851), founder of Llandovery College in Wales
 Thomas Phillipps (1792–1872), British antiquary and book collector
 Thomas Benbow Phillips (1829–1915), pioneer of the Welsh settlements in Brazil
 Thomas Jodrell Phillips (1807–1897), English philanthropist, changed his name to Thomas Jodrell Phillips Jodrell in 1868 
 Tom Phillips (Royal Navy officer) (1888–1941), British admiral

See also
Thomas Phelpes, MP
Thomas Philips, Parliament of Ireland MP